The 1977 Virginia Slims of Florida  was a women's tennis tournament played on indoor carpet courts at the Sportatorium in Hollywood, Florida, United States, that was part of the 1977 Virginia Slims World Championship Series. It was the inaugural edition of the tournament and was held from January 10 through January 16, 1977. First-seeded Chris Evert won the singles title and earned $20,000 first-prize money.

Finals

Singles
 Chris Evert defeated  Margaret Court 6–3, 6–4
 It was Evert's 1st singles title of the year and the 68th of her career.

Doubles
 Martina Navratilova /  Betty Stöve defeated  Rosie Casals /  Chris Evert 6–4, 3–6, 6–4

Prize money

References

External links
 ITF tournament edition details

Virginia Slims of Hollywood
Virginia Slims
Virginia Slims of Florida
Virginia Slims of Florida